Kunchithapadam Gopalan (born 1938) is an Indian geochronologist and an emeritus scientist at National Geophysical Research Institute. He is known for his studies on the chronologies of critical rock suites of the Indian subcontinent and is an elected fellow of the Indian Academy of Sciences, Indian National Science Academy, Indian Geophysical Union and the National Academy of Sciences, India. The Council of Scientific and Industrial Research, the apex agency of the Government of India for scientific research, awarded him the Shanti Swarup Bhatnagar Prize for Science and Technology, one of the highest Indian science awards for his contributions to earth, atmosphere, ocean and planetary sciences in 1982.

Biography 

K. Gopalan, born on 12 August 1938 in the south Indian state of Tamil Nadu, graduated in physics (Bsc hons) from the University of Madras in 1959 and completed his master's degree in nuclear physics from Andhra University in 1960, standing first in the university. Enrolling at the Indian Institute of Science for his doctoral studies, he secured a PhD in 1966, working under the guidance of V. S. Venkatasubramanian and moved to the University of California, Los Angeles where he did his postdoctoral studies at the laboratory of George Wetherill on meteorites and lunar samples. On his return to India, he joined Tata Institute of Fundamental Research in 1970 but moved to Physical Research Laboratory in 1973. His next move was to the National Geophysical Research Institute (NGRI) where he served for the rest of his career and after his superannuation in 1998, he continues his association with the institute as its emeritus scientist.

Legacy 

After his early studies on meteorites and lunar samples, Gopalan's focus shifted during his PRL days to geochronology. His work has been primarily in the field of geochronology and he is known to have conducted extensive studies on the chronologies of several critical rock suites of the Indian subcontinent for which he developed custom-built equipment. He worked on the precambrian Rajasthan and Madhya Pradesh using Rb-Sr dating techniques with mass spectrometer as well as the volcanic rocks of the Deccan plateau and his researches have assisted in a wider understanding of the ages of solid bodies in the solar system and basaltic volcanism in Mare Tranquillitatis. He is credited with the setting up of a mass spectrometer, a facility for Argon–argon dating of rocks, and an isotope facility at Physical Research Laboratory, a geochronology laboratory at National geophysical Research Institute and an Accelerator Mass Spectrometer for radiocarbon dating at the Institute of Physics, Bhubaneswar, the first such facility in India. His studies have been detailed in several peer reviewed articles; a number of them have been listed by online article repositories such as ResearchGate and Google Scholar. He has been associated with many science journals including the Academy Proceedings in Earth and Planetary Sciences as a member of their editorial boards and has delivered several invited or plenary lectures. 
His work has been cited by many authors and he has also mentored 8 doctoral scholars in their studies.

Awards and honours 
Gopalan, a Fulbright scholar during this doctoral studies, received the Krishnan Medal of the Indian Geophysical Union in 1982. The Council of Scientific and Industrial Research awarded him the Shanti Swarup Bhatnagar Prize, one of the highest Indian science awards, the same year. He was awarded the Eminent Mass Spectrometrist Award of the Indian Society for Mass Spectrometry in 1991. The Indian Academy of Sciences elected him as a fellow in 1986, followed by Indian National Science Academy in 1986, Indian Geophysical Union in 1988 and the National Academy of Sciences, India in 1992.

Selected bibliography

See also 

 George Wetherill
 Mare Tranquillitatis
 Rb-Sr dating
 Argon–argon dating

Notes

References

External links

Further reading 
 

Recipients of the Shanti Swarup Bhatnagar Award in Earth, Atmosphere, Ocean & Planetary Sciences
1938 births
Indian scientific authors
Indian geologists
Fellows of the Indian Academy of Sciences
Fellows of the Indian National Science Academy
Fellows of The National Academy of Sciences, India
Fellows of the Indian Geophysical Union
University of Madras alumni
Andhra University alumni
Indian Institute of Science alumni
University of California, Los Angeles alumni
Academic staff of Tata Institute of Fundamental Research
Living people
Scientists from Tamil Nadu